Gangkou is a town under the administration of the prefecture-level city of Zhongshan, in the Pearl River Delta region of Guangdong province, China, and is located to the north of downtown Zhongshan.

External links

 Gangkou government website 

Zhongshan
Township-level divisions of Guangdong